Shane Wilson (born 27 April 1972) is an Australian former professional rugby league footballer who played for the Illawarra Steelers and the South Sydney Rabbitohs.  Wilson also played in England for Widnes.

Playing career
Wilson, who played predominantly as a centre, started his NSWRL career at Illawarra in 1991. After two seasons he moved to South Sydney and made 64 premiership appearances over five years at his new club. Wilson played for Souths in their upset 1994 Tooheys Challenge Cup final victory over Brisbane.

He finished his professional rugby league career in England, playing for Widnes in 1998.

References

External links
Shane Wilson at Rugby League project

1972 births
Living people
Australian rugby league players
Illawarra Steelers players
South Sydney Rabbitohs players
Widnes Vikings players
Rugby league centres